Christian James Fraser (born 13 November 1973) is a British journalist, newsreader, writer and broadcaster, specialising in news and current affairs, who is a BBC News senior news correspondent and chief presenter. He presents The Context.

Fraser was a long time foreign correspondent for the BBC based in Nairobi, Rome, Cairo, and Paris. He is currently the BBC's Senior News Correspondent, and based in London presenting on major international stories. Since the inauguration of Donald Trump, he has co-hosted Beyond 100 Days alongside Katty Kay broadcast at 7pm on BBC World News worldwide and the BBC News Channel and BBC Four in the UK.

Early life
Christian James Fraser was born on 13 November 1973 in Burnley, Lancashire. He attended Queen Elizabeth's Grammar School, Blackburn, before graduating in Spanish and Business Studies at Leeds Metropolitan University.

Career
Fraser joined Trinity Mirror in 1995, as a trainee reporter, working for the Sunday Mirror and the Daily Mirror. He became a full staff correspondent on the Daily Mirror in 1996 before joining the BBC in 2000. 
Fraser began his professional broadcasting career as an investigative reporter for BBC Radio 5 Live. In 2002 and 2003 he reported on the wars in Afghanistan and Iraq. He spent several months in Baghdad reporting on the transition. In 2004 he embedded with the Welsh Guards in Al Amarah where British forces were battling the insurgency of Muqtada al-Sadr.

In 2005 he was posted to Nairobi, where he reported on the wars in the Democratic Republic of the Congo and South Sudan. In the summer of 2006 he moved to Rome, where he was the BBC's correspondent for almost two years. In that time he reported on the war in Lebanon and in 2007 in Italy he covered the murder of Meredith Kercher and the trial of Amanda Knox. A year later he moved to Cairo. Fraser was the only British correspondent inside Gaza in 2007 during the Israeli invasion, known as Operation Cast Lead. He spent a week in the Palestinian city of Rafah as the Israelis dismantled the tunnels.

In 2010 Fraser covered the revolution in Egypt for BBC TV and was appointed that year as the BBC's correspondent in Paris. In 2011 he reported on the war in Libya, first from the rebel held Benghazi and then from Tripoli as the war dragged on. In 2014 he returned to London as the BBC News Channel's Senior News Correspondent, reporting from Crimea, during the Russian takeover. In 2015/16 he presented live coverage of the unfolding terrorist attacks in France and Belgium. He now presents for the BBC News Channel, BBC World News, BBC Breakfast and Radio 4's PM programme.

In 2022, he became a presenter of the BBC current affairs programme Newsnight.

In 2022, he became the main presenter of the BBC News programme The Context with Christian Fraser. He also presented the overnight coverage following the death of Queen Elizabeth II as well as some of the days leading up to the funeral. In February 2023  it was announced Fraser would become a chief presenter on the BBC’s new news channel for both UK and international viewers due to launch in April.

Awards 
In 2005 Fraser collected Gold at the Sony Radio Awards for Five Live's rolling coverage of the Indian Ocean earthquake and tsunami, which he had presented through the night. At the Prix Bayeux in 2007 he was recognised in the international radio category for his reports on child casualties. In 2006 he was nominated in the News Journalist of the Year category at the Sony Radio Awards.

Personal life

Fraser is married to Topaz Amoore, a journalist who was foreign editor at The Daily Telegraph before being handed assistant editorship. Fraser has two children and lives in London. He supports Burnley F.C.

References

External links
Official website
Agent - Riva Media

Living people
BBC newsreaders and journalists
BBC World News
British reporters and correspondents
People educated at Queen Elizabeth's Grammar School, Blackburn
People from Burnley
1973 births